Iznatoraf is a municipality located in the province of Jaén, Spain. According to the 2005 census, the municipality has a population of 1188 inhabitants.

See also
Sierra de Cazorla
Antonio Tavira y Almazán

References

External links

Municipalities in the Province of Jaén (Spain)